Karim Jafar  is a former Iraqi football defender who played for Iraq at the 1984 Summer Olympics.

Karim played for Iraq in 1984.

References

Iraqi footballers
Iraq international footballers
Living people
Al-Mina'a SC players
Association football defenders
Olympic footballers of Iraq
Footballers at the 1984 Summer Olympics
Year of birth missing (living people)